Marko Banić (born August 31, 1984) is a Croatian professional basketball player.

Professional career
Banić has played with Zadar and Bilbao Berri. He was chosen as the EuroCup MVP in 2010.

In June 2012 he signed with a three-year contract with UNICS Kazan in Russia. He was released after suffering a knee injury.

In September 2013, he signed a two-year deal with the Spanish club CB Estudiantes. In September 2014, he left Estudiantes and signed a one-year deal with the German club Alba Berlin.

In September 2015, he returned to UNICS Kazan, signing a 1+1 year contract.

On December 13, 2017, he signed with Turkish club Pınar Karşıyaka.

On November 10, 2018, he signed with Croatian champion Cedevita Zagreb.

Croatian national team
Banić was part of the Croatian national basketball teams at the EuroBasket 2007, the 2008 Olympic Basketball Tournament, the EuroBasket 2009.

EuroLeague career statistics

|-
| style="text-align:left;"| 2011–12
| style="text-align:left;"| Gescrap BB
| 20 || 12 || 25.2 || .625 || .200 || .794 || 4.0 || .7 || .4 || .1 || 13.3 || 13.4
|-
| style="text-align:left;"| 2014–15
| style="text-align:left;"| Alba Berlin
| 23 || 8 || 19.5 || .638 || .000 || .878 || 2.9 || .9 || .4 || .3 || 8.8 || 9.2
|-
| style="text-align:left;"| 2016–17
| style="text-align:left;"| UNICS
| 24 || 4 || 13.3 || .614 || .000 || .818 || 1.7 || .300 || .300 || .200 || 4.6 || 4
|- class="sortbottom"
| style="text-align:left;"| Career
| style="text-align:left;"|
| 43 || 20 || 22.2 || .631 || .200 || .826 || 3.4 || .8 || .4 || .2 || 10.9 || 11.2

References

External links

Marko Banić at euroleague.net
Marko Banić at fiba.com

1984 births
Living people
2010 FIBA World Championship players
ABA League players
Alba Berlin players
Basketball players at the 2008 Summer Olympics
BC UNICS players
Bilbao Basket players
CB Estudiantes players
Centers (basketball)
Croatian expatriate basketball people in Turkey
Croatian men's basketball players
Karşıyaka basketball players
KK Cedevita players
KK Zadar players
Liga ACB players
Olympic basketball players of Croatia
Power forwards (basketball)
Basketball players from Zadar